This article refers to the land grant.  For the cities of the Palos Verdes Peninsula, see Palos Verdes

Rancho de los Palos Verdes was a  Mexican land grant in present-day Los Angeles County, California given in 1846  by Governor Pío Pico to José Loreto and Juan Capistrano Sepulveda.  The name means "range of green trees".  The grant encompassed the present-day cities of the Palos Verdes Peninsula, as well as portions of  San Pedro and Torrance.

History

The grant was originally a part of Manuel Dominguez's  Rancho San Pedro  Spanish land grant. Around 1810 Manuel Guttierez, executor of Dominguez's will and de facto owner of his rancho, granted permission to then 17-year-old Jose Dolores Sepulveda to herd livestock in the southwestern reaches of the Rancho San Pedro. This eventually became the basis for the Sepulveda family's contested claim to the Rancho de los Palos Verdes. Dolores had trouble getting his land title cleared, so he took a trip to Monterey to get the matter definitely settled and, on his return trip, he was killed in the Chumash revolt at Mission La Purísima Concepción in 1824. In 1834, a judicial decree was made by Governor Jose Figueroa which was intended to settle the dispute between the Dominquez and Sepulveda families.

With the cession of California to the United States following the Mexican–American War, the 1848 Treaty of Guadalupe Hidalgo provided that the land grants would be honored.  As required by the Land Act of 1851, a claim for Rancho de los Palos Verdes was filed with the Public Land Commission in 1852, and the grant was patented to José Loreto and Juan Capistrano Sepulveda in 1880.

By 1882 ownership of the land had passed from the Sepulveda through various mortgage holders to Jotham Bixby of Rancho Los Cerritos, who leased the land to Japanese farmers. After the turn of the century most of Bixby's land was sold to a consortium of New York investors spearheaded by Frank A. Vanderlip that created The Palos Verdes Project and began marketing land on the peninsula for small horse ranches and residential communities.

Historic sites of the Rancho
Site of Adobe Home of Jose Dolores Sepulveda. Dolores Sepulveda's adobe was built in 1818. The Jose Dolores Sepulveda Adobe was designated a California Historic Landmark (No. 383) on Jan. 03, 1944.

See also
Ranchos of California
List of Ranchos of California

References

External links
Map of old Spanish and Mexican ranchos in Los Angeles County
 
 

Palos Verdes
Palos Verdes
Palos Verdes Peninsula
San Pedro, Los Angeles
Torrance, California
19th century in Los Angeles
1809 in Alta California
1809 establishments in Alta California